The Romanian Academy is a cultural forum founded in Bucharest, Romania, in 1866. It covers the scientific, artistic and literary domains. The academy has 181 active members who are elected for life.

According to its bylaws, the academy's main goals are the cultivation of Romanian language and Romanian literature, the study of the national history of Romania and research into major scientific domains. Some of the academy's fundamental projects are the Romanian language dictionary (Dicționarul explicativ al limbii române), the dictionary of Romanian literature, and the treatise on the history of the Romanian people.

History
On the initiative of C. A. Rosetti, the Academy was founded on April 1, 1866, as Societatea Literară Română.  The founding members were illustrious members of the Romanian society of the age.

The name changed to Societatea Academică Romînă in 1867, and finally to Academia Română in 1879, during the reign of Carol I.

The founding members of the Academy:

The Presidents of the Academy:

Library

Established in 1867, the Bibilioteca Academiei Române has a collection of over seven million books and collections of drawings, engravings, maps, and coins. The Academy also operates its own publishing house.

Reception
In 2014, antisemitism expert Michael Shafir stated that the academy "is packed with Holocaust deniers and trivializers".

See also
List of members of the Romanian Academy
List of purged members of the Romanian Academy
Romanian Academy of Sciences

References

External links

 
Romanian Academy
Romanian Academy
Romanian Academy
Romanian Academy
1866 establishments in Romania
Members of the International Council for Science
Members of the International Science Council